The Tanzania Environmental Conservation Society, also known as TECOSO, is a Tanzania non-governmental organization founded in the year 1998 and registered on February 11, 1999, under the Societies Act CAP.337 R.E.2002 from The Societies (Application for Registration) Rules of 1954. Its focus is Environmental protection and Habitat conservation, promoting an integrated approach that includes community development, Environmental education, Nature conservation and Ecotourism. The organisation is also a piece of supportive machinery in collaborating and conducting field research projects, Leadership development, Vocational education that focus on gender parity.

Conservation approach
TECOSO Tanzania also maintains an inter-continental network for information exchange and capacity building of conservation efforts. It works with different partners, including government institutions or associations, researchers, local and international learning institutions, universities and other NGOs. Most of the organisation activities are undertaken in Arusha Region, Manyara Region, Dar es Salaam, and Kilimanjaro Region.

See also
Lake Chala
Mount Kilimanjaro
List of Tanzanian conservation organisations

External links

 TECOSO Website

References

Nature conservation in Tanzania
Organisations based in Tanzania
Animal welfare organisations based in Tanzania
Bird conservation organizations
Economic development organizations
Environmental organizations established in 1998
Organizations established in 1998
1998 establishments in Tanzania